Emeka Friday Eze (born 26 September 1996) is a Nigerian footballer who plays as a striker for Turkish club İstanbulspor on loan from Eyüpspor.

Playing career

Early career
After playing for a minor club in Nigeria, Eze arrived in Cameroon in 2013, where he started off playing for a local football academy in Mbanga.
He then joined Oxygène de Mfou, a second division regional club in the Centre region, in 2014. Despite not playing the whole of first season he managed eleven goals and close to thirty the next season, earning him titles for the best player and top scorer in the league respectively.

Aigle Royal Menoua
Following the two successful seasons with Oxygène, Eze was offered a contract by MTN Elite One (Ligue 1) club Aigle Royal Menoua.
He ended the 2016 season with nine goals and was among the 25 nominees for the league's best player award.

RoPS
In 2017, Eze was headed to Cameroonian champion UMS de Loum, but set his sights to Europe instead. After trying out for Estonian Paide Linnameeskond, he ended up playing for RoPS in Rovaniemi, Finland. He scored a goal in his first appearance with RoPS in a friendly match against IFK Luleå.
Having made his Veikkausliiga debut on 22 April 2017, Eze's first goal came a week later in his second game, against PS Kemi.

İstanbulspor
On 11 January 2023, Eke was loaned by İstanbulspor.

References

External links

1996 births
Sportspeople from Lagos
Living people
Nigerian footballers
Association football forwards
Aigle Royal Menoua players
Rovaniemen Palloseura players
SK Sturm Graz players
Adanaspor footballers
Ankara Keçiörengücü S.K. footballers
Eyüpspor footballers
İstanbulspor footballers
Veikkausliiga players
Austrian Football Bundesliga players
TFF First League players
Süper Lig players
Nigerian expatriate footballers
Expatriate footballers in Cameroon
Nigerian expatriate sportspeople in Cameroon
Expatriate footballers in Finland
Nigerian expatriate sportspeople in Finland
Expatriate footballers in Austria
Nigerian expatriate sportspeople in Austria
Expatriate footballers in Turkey
Nigerian expatriate sportspeople in Turkey